Thomas McCormack may refer to:

 Thomas McCormack (writer) (born 1932), author, playwright and former book-publishing executive
 Thomas McCormack (California politician), Canada-born California politician
 Thomas Arthur McCormack (1883–1973), New Zealand artist
 Thomas J. McCormack (1922–1998), member of the Pennsylvania State Senate and the Pennsylvania House of Representatives
 Tom McCormack (Erin's Own hurler) (1888–1959), Irish hurler for Kilkenny and Erin's Own
 Tom McCormack (James Stephens hurler) (born 1953), Irish hurler for Kilkenny and James Stephens
 Tom McCormack (footballer), New Zealand association footballer